The Narragansett Runestone, also known as the Quidnessett Rock, is a  slab of metasandstone located in Rhode Island, United States. It is inscribed with two rows of symbols, which some have indicated resemble ancient runic characters.

The stone was stolen in 2012. On April 26, 2013, the Rhode Island Attorney General announced that the rock was recovered after an individual came forward with information. The rock was moved to the University of Rhode Island School of Oceanography for testing, but the tests were not carried out because it would have required damaging the stone.

In January 2014, plans were announced to move the runestone to Goddard Memorial State Park in East Greenwich. In October 2015, the runestone was placed for long-term public viewing in Wickford, a village of North Kingstown, Rhode Island.

Provenance
The Narragansett runestone was first reported to the Rhode Island Historical Preservation and Heritage Commission (HPHC) in the 1980s. The New England Antiquities Research Association (NEARA) ran several studies and published a number of papers about the rock in the 1980s and 1990s. According to NEARA, the stone was discovered by a quahogger in December 1984 while digging in the mud flats of Narragansett Bay.

The HPHC was unable to find any information about the stone in any previous inventories of Narragansett Bay. They found that as early as 1939, the runestone was located upland and may have been buried. Recently, the inscriptions on the stone were visible only for a short period of time between the shifting tides, due to dramatic erosion of the shoreline at Pojac Point and the fact that the stone was positioned only  from the extreme low tide mark.

In 2014, Everett Brown of Providence reported that he and his brother Warren had carved the runes on Quidnessett Rock in the summer of 1964. He said that he had forgotten about the incident until the stone was removed and recovered in 2013. His account has been disputed by other local people, who state that they saw the stone before 1964, and have challenged other elements of his statements.

Media
The stone is referenced in episode 11 of season 1 of America Unearthed.

Disappearance and recovery
The state Coastal Resources Management Council reported that the runestone had been removed from the tidal waters off Pojac Point between July and August 2012. In May 2013, the state Attorney General’s Environmental Unit and DEM’s Criminal Investigation Unit announced that they had recovered the stone.

Town historian and independent columnist G. Timothy Cranston said that a Pojac Point resident had removed the stone, as he was tired of having tourists scouring the neighborhood and shoreline looking for the stone. He said that the resident, who was not named, was ordered by state officials to retrieve the stone after having sunk it in deeper waters off the coast. After the stone was recovered, in October 2015 it was placed for long-term public viewing in Wickford, a village of the Town of North Kingstown, Rhode Island.

See also
 Kensington Runestone
 AVM Runestone
 Heavener Runestone

References

1939 archaeological discoveries
20th-century inscriptions
American folklore
Inscriptions of disputed origin
Narragansett Bay
North American runestone hoaxes
Pseudoarchaeology
Rhode Island culture